Dypsis decaryi is a species of flowering plant in the Arecaceae family. It is commonly known as the triangle palm. It is indigenous to the Madagascan rainforest. It is relatively new to cultivation however, so outside its native habitat it rarely achieves anything like that height. The leaf bases are arranged in three vertical columns set about 120 degrees apart on the main stem, forming a triangular shape in cross section. This shape has given rise to the palm's common name.

The inflorescences branch out from the axils of the lower leaves.

The palm is a fine ornamental plant and is most valuable as a specimen tree or accent plant when grown out in the open to display show its remarkable shape to best advantage. In suitable climates it blooms all year. What with its colourful flowers and fruit and shapely habit, it is unusually showy for a palm. It prefers full sun and regular watering, although it is not vulnerable to occasional dryness and partial shade.  Over-watering and poor drainage are far greater hazards than drought. For example, the palm is best suited to well drained sandy soil.

Dypsis decaryi does not transplant well, so it is a bad choice for commercial field growing. However, it is a fast grower once established, and its seed normally germinates within a month of being planted, so propagation by seed is a good option.

Threatened status
Although this species is now commonly cultivated in a variety of climates, there are only about 1,000 individuals left in its native habitat of a small area in Andohahela National Park, southern Madagascar. It is threatened both by fire and the harvesting of its seeds for export.

References

decaryi
Endemic flora of Madagascar
Vulnerable plants
Taxa named by Henri Lucien Jumelle